Swanson is a surname. It is often the anglicized form of the Swedish surname Svensson. Notable people with this surname include the following:

Baseball and football
 A. L. Swanson, American football coach
 Bill Swanson (baseball) (1888–1954), baseball player
 Clarence Swanson (1898–1970), American football player
 Danny Swanson (born 1986), Scottish footballer
 Dansby Swanson (born 1994), American baseball player
 Erik Swanson (born 1993), American baseball player
 Evar Swanson (1902–1973), American baseball and football player
 Mallory Swanson, American soccer player
 Riley Swanson (born 1984), American football player
 Stan Swanson (1944–2017), American baseball player
 Tanner Swanson, American baseball coach

Misc
 Arthur Swanson (1926–2010), American businessman and politician
 Becca Swanson, American bodybuilder
 Bob Swanson (driver) (1912–1940), Indianapolis 500 driver
 Brandon Swanson (born 1989), American student who disappeared in 2008
 Brian Swanson (born 1976), ice hockey player
 Bryan Swanson (born 1980), British sports television reporter
 Carl A. Swanson (1879-1949), Swedish-American food industry businessman and founder of Swanson
 Charles Edward Swanson (1879–1970), American politician
 Claude A. Swanson (1862–1939), American lawyer and politician
 Cub Swanson (born 1983), American mixed martial artist
 David Swanson, American journalist and Democratic activist
 Don R. Swanson (1924–2012), American information scientist
 Donald Swanson (1848–1924), London police officer, charged with investigating the Whitechapel murders
 Duane Swanson (1913–2000), American basketball player
 E. Burton Swanson (born 1939), American computer scientist
 Eric Swanson, American attorney
 Frank J. Swanson (1865-1941), American politician
 G. A. Swanson (1939–2009), American organizational theorist
 Gloria Swanson (1899–1983), American actress
 Hilding Alfred Swanson (1885-1964), American lawyer and politician
 Howard Swanson (1907–1978), American composer
 Irena Swanson, Yugoslav-born American mathematician
 Jackie Swanson (born 1963), American actress
 James C. Swanson (born 1934), American educator and politician
 James L. Swanson (born 1959), American author and historian
 Jandi Swanson, American child actress
 Jean Swanson, Canadian anti-poverty activist
 Jeffrey Swanson, American psychiatrist
 John Swanson (disambiguation), several people
 John Swanson (Medal of Honor recipient), American Civil War sailor and Medal of Honor recipient
 John A. Swanson, American engineer
 John August Swanson (1938–2021), American artist
 Jon E. Swanson (1942–1971), US Army helicopter pilot and Medal of Honor recipient
 Joshua Swanson (born 1978), American actor
 Kristy Swanson (born 1969), American actress
 Lori Swanson, attorney general of Minnesota
 Marc Swanson, American artist
 Meryl Swanson (born 1970), Australian politician
 Paul Swanson, American bridge player
 Richard A. Swanson (born 1942), American organizational theorist
 Richard Swanson, American founder of SunPower
 Robert Swanson (inventor) (1905–1994), Canadian inventor and poet
 Robert A. Swanson (1947–1999), Genentech founder
 Sandré Swanson (born 1948), California politician
 Shana Swanson (born 1967), American attorney
 Stephan Swanson (born 1967), South African shark researcher
 Steve Swanson (musician), guitarist
 Steven Swanson (born 1960), American astronaut
 Timothy Swanson, British academic
 Wendy Sue Swanson, Pediatrician
 William Swanson (disambiguation), several people

Fictional
 Joe Swanson, Family Guy character
 Ron Swanson, Parks and Recreation character

See also
 Svensson (surname)
 Swanston (surname)
 Swanton (surname)